Executive Order 13770, entitled "Ethics Commitments by Executive Branch Appointees," was an executive order issued by US President Donald Trump on January 28, 2017, that directs executive branch employees on a ban from becoming a lobbyist for five years.  The order, which reflected an increasingly standard practice of issuing such ethics rules by executive order early in a new administration, borrowed language from similar orders issued by past administrations.

Trump revoked the order on the final day of his presidency, allowing his administration's officials to immediately begin working as lobbyists.

Purpose
Ethics Pledge. Every appointee in every executive agency appointed on or after January 20, 2017, shall sign, and upon signing shall be contractually committed to, the following pledge upon becoming an appointee:

Review of order
The executive order directs executive branch employees on a ban on lobbying any government official for two years and the agency they worked in for five years. It also prevents them from ever lobbying the US on behalf of a foreign government or foreign political parties. If someone is found guilty of not complying with the order, they could be barred for another five years on top of the order's five years for a total of ten years. Section 3 provides that the president may grant a waiver to any person of any restriction contained in the pledge. The order does not explain on what grounds a waiver may be granted. The order has a lifetime ban on lobbying for foreign governments.

Revocation
Trump revoked the order on the final day of his presidency without explanation.  This allowed his appointees, some of whom had had trouble finding work after the White House, to immediately begin working as lobbyists.  President Bill Clinton similarly revoked his comparable executive order at the end of his presidency, something Trump criticized him for during the 2016 campaign.

Reaction
NPRs Tamara Keith states, "As Trump's team drafted his order on ethics, they appear to have borrowed heavily from the language used in orders signed by both Clinton and President Obama. Obama also pulled from Clinton, in parts and the ethics directive signed by President George W. Bush is nearly identical to the one signed by his father twelve years earlier. But that's less surprising given those were presidents using the language of their predecessor from the same party. Perhaps more importantly, Trump not only seems to be lifting from Democratic presidents' language, but they are presidents he has condemned, including for not draining the swamp." "The story here is not the copying per se, it is the claim Trump has been making that he is doing something really different, new, and righteous when, apparently, in many respects he is actually copying Democrats he so thoroughly condemned as corrupt," said John Woolley, a professor at UC Santa Barbara and co-director of the Presidency Project.

Government watchdog groups criticized the revocation of the order.  Robert Weissman, president of consumer-rights group Public Citizen, said that "The revocation of the 5-year lobbying ban for presidential appointees is the perfect coda for the most corrupt administration in American history."  Noah Bookbinder, executive director of the nonpartisan government ethics and accountability watchdog group Citizens for Responsibility and Ethics in Washington, said that "By rescinding his ethics order and letting his staffers immediately become lobbyists, the man who pledged to drain the swamp took a giant step to fill it."  News coverage contrasted the revocation of the ban with Trump's earlier pledge to "drain the swamp."

See also
 List of executive actions by Donald Trump

References

External links 
 

2017 in American law
Executive orders of Donald Trump
Lobbying in the United States